The 45th National Film Awards, presented by Directorate of Film Festivals, the organisation set up by Ministry of Information and Broadcasting, India to felicitate the best of Indian Cinema released in the year 1997. The awards were announced on 8 May 1998 and presented on 10 July 1998 by then President of India, K. R. Narayanan.

Awards 

Awards were divided into feature films, non-feature films and books written on Indian cinema.

Lifetime Achievement Award

Feature films 

Feature films were awarded at All India as well as regional level. For National Film Awards, a Kannada film, Thaayi Saheba won the National Film Award for Best Feature Film also winning the maximum number of awards (4). Following were the awards given in each category:

Juries 

A committee headed by B. Saroja Devi was appointed to evaluate the feature films awards. Following were the jury members:

 Jury Members
 B. Saroja Devi (Chairperson)P. MadhavanMaheep SinghC. V. L. SastryAruna PurohitUma da CunhaDevender KhandelwalSandip RaySantwana BordoloiArundathi NagPushpa BharatiK. R. MohananV. Madhusudhana Rao

All India Award 

Following were the awards given:

Golden Lotus Award 

Official Name: Swarna Kamal

All the awardees are awarded with 'Golden Lotus Award (Swarna Kamal)', a certificate and cash prize.

Silver Lotus Award 

Official Name: Rajat Kamal

All the awardees are awarded with 'Silver Lotus Award (Rajat Kamal)', a certificate and cash prize.

Regional Awards 

The award is given to best film in the regional languages in India.

Non-Feature Films 

Short Films made in any Indian language and certified by the Central Board of Film Certification as a documentary/newsreel/fiction are eligible for non-feature film section.

Juries 

A committee headed by K. K. Kapil was appointed to evaluate the non-feature films awards. Following were the jury members:

 Jury Members
 K. K. Kapil (Chairperson)Dinkar ChowdharyShashi RanjanParvathi MenonNamita Gokhale

Golden Lotus Award 

Official Name: Swarna Kamal

All the awardees are awarded with 'Golden Lotus Award (Swarna Kamal)', a certificate and cash prize.

Silver Lotus Award 

Official Name: Rajat Kamal

All the awardees are awarded with 'Silver Lotus Award (Rajat Kamal)' and cash prize.

Best Writing on Cinema 

The awards aim at encouraging study and appreciation of cinema as an art form and dissemination of information and critical appreciation of this art-form through publication of books, articles, reviews etc.

Juries 

A committee headed by Chidananda Dasgupta was appointed to evaluate the writing on Indian cinema. Following were the jury members:

 Jury Members
 Chidananda Dasgupta (Chairperson)Tarun VijayChandan Mitra

Golden Lotus Award 
Official Name: Swarna Kamal

All the awardees are awarded with 'Golden Lotus Award (Swarna Kamal)' and cash prize.

Awards not given 

Following were the awards not given as no film was found to be suitable for the award:

 Best Special Effects
 Best Feature Film in Assamese
 Best Feature Film in English
 Best Feature Film in Manipuri
 Best Feature Film in Marathi
 Best Non-Feature Film Music Direction

References

External links 
 National Film Awards Archives
 Official Page for Directorate of Film Festivals, India

National Film Awards (India) ceremonies
1998 Indian film awards